The 23d CBRN Battalion is a Chemical, biological, radiological, nuclear and high-yield explosives defense battalion of the United States Army, part of the 2ID Sustainment Brigade of the 2nd Infantry Division at Camp Humphreys, Korea.

It traces its lineage back to the 1944 formation of the 23rd Chemical Smoke Generator Battalion in England during World War II. The 23rd was inactivated after the end of the war and reactivated in 1949 as the 4th Chemical Smoke Generator Battalion, serving in the Korean War before being inactivated in Germany at the end of the 1950s. The 23rd Chemical Battalion was reactivated in Korea in 1988.

History

Constituted 27 May 1944 in the Army of the United States as Headquarters and Headquarters Detachment, 23d Chemical Smoke Generator Battalion, and activated in England
Inactivated 12 November 1945 in France
Redesignated 18 January 1949 as Headquarters and Headquarters Detachment, 4th Chemical Smoke Generator Battalion, and allotted to the Regular Army
Activated 1 February 1949 at the Army Chemical Center, Edgewood, Maryland
Reorganized and redesignated 4 March 1954 as Headquarters and Headquarters Detachment, 4th Chemical Battalion
Inactivated 15 June 1959 in Germany
Redesignated 16 September 1988 as Headquarters and Headquarters Detachment, 23d Chemical Battalion, and activated in Korea

In a 4 April 2013 ceremony, the 23d Chemical Battalion was officially transferred back to Korea after spending eight years at Joint Base Lewis–McChord. On 16 October 2016, its headquarters and headquarters detachment was redesignated as a company.

Composition
The 23d CBRN Battalion is currently composed of:
 Headquarters and Headquarters Company, 23rd CBRN Battalion, Camp Humphreys
 4th CBRN Company, Camp Humphreys
 61st CBRN Company, Camp Humphreys
 62nd CBRN Company, Camp Humphreys
 501st CBRN Company (Technical Escort), Camp Humphreys
 718th Ordnance Company (EOD), Camp Humphreys

As of 10 June 2013, the following companies were reassigned from the 23rd CBRNE BN.
 63rd Chemical Company, Fort Campbell  – To 2nd CM BN
 92nd Chemical Company, Fort Stewart  -To 83rd CM BN

Campaign participation credit
 World War II
 Normandy
 Northern France
 Rhineland
 Ardennes-Alsace
 Central Europe
 Korean War
 UN Defensive
 UN Offensive
 CCF Intervention
 First UN Counteroffensive
 CCF Spring Offensive
 UN Summer-Fall Offensive
 Second Korean Winter
 Korea, Summer-Fall 1952
 Third Korean Winter
 Korea, Summer 1953
 War on Terrorism
 Afghanistan: Consolidation II

Decorations
Meritorious Unit Commendation (Army), Streamer embroidered KOREA 1952
Meritorious Unit Commendation (Army), Streamer embroidered KOREA 1952–1953
Meritorious Unit Commendation (Army), Streamer embroidered AFGHANISTAN 2007–2008
Army Superior Unit Award, Streamer embroidered 2013–2014
Republic of Korea Presidential Unit Citation, Streamer embroidered KOREA 1950–1952
Republic of Korea Presidential Unit Citation, Streamer embroidered KOREA 1952–1953

References

Military units and formations established in 1944
Chemical battalions of the United States Army
Military units of the United States Army in South Korea
Military units and formations of the United States Army in World War II
United States Army units and formations in the Korean War
United States